Marquis Victor Cooper (March 11, 1982 – March 2009, missing, presumed dead) was an American football linebacker in the National Football League (NFL) . He was drafted by the Tampa Bay Buccaneers in the third round of the 2004 NFL Draft.  Cooper had also played for the Minnesota Vikings, Pittsburgh Steelers, Seattle Seahawks, Jacksonville Jaguars and Oakland Raiders.  He played college football at the University of Washington.

On March 1, 2009, Cooper and three other men went missing after their boat capsized in rough seas near Clearwater, Florida. Cooper and two of the men are now presumed to be dead.

Early and personal life 

Cooper was the oldest child of KPNX sportscaster Bruce Cooper and wife Donna. He has a younger sister named Donielle. He was born in Mesa, Arizona and in raised in Gilbert, Arizona, and attended Gilbert Junior High School and Highland High School, where he became an All-State player in football.

Though his grandfather worked in the athletic department of Arizona State University, Cooper attended the University of Washington. He graduated with a degree in sociology and was a member of the Pac-10 All-Conference team in 2003. Cooper and wife Rebekah, who met while attending the University of Washington, have a daughter named Delaney Christine. In the offseason, the family lived in Tampa, Florida.

Professional career

Tampa Bay Buccaneers
Cooper was drafted by the Tampa Bay Buccaneers in the third round (79th overall) of the 2004 NFL Draft. He was released just before the start of the 2006 season, on September 2.

Minnesota Vikings
Cooper signed with the Minnesota Vikings on September 5, 2006. He was released on October 30.

First stint with Pittsburgh Steelers
On October 31, 2006, Cooper was claimed off waivers by the Pittsburgh Steelers. The Steelers waived him on December 5.

Seattle Seahawks
Cooper was signed by the Seattle Seahawks on December 12. He finished the 2006 season with the team and was released the following year on July 27, 2007.

Second stint with Pittsburgh Steelers
Cooper was claimed off waivers by the Steelers on July 30, 2007. On September 19, he was released by the Steelers.

Jacksonville Jaguars
On November 27, 2007, Cooper signed with the Jacksonville Jaguars. The Jaguars released him on December 7.

Third stint with Pittsburgh Steelers
The Steelers signed Cooper for a third time on December 9, 2007. He became a free agent in the 2008 offseason.

Oakland Raiders
Cooper was signed by the Oakland Raiders on November 5, 2008, after linebacker Robert Thomas was placed on injured reserve.

Statistics

Boating accident and disappearance 

On March 1, 2009, 10 days before Cooper's 27th birthday, the U.S. Coast Guard reported that a 21-foot fishing boat was missing off the Gulf Coast near Clearwater, Florida.  The boat was carrying four passengers: Cooper, Corey Smith, and two former University of South Florida football players, Nick Schuyler and Will Bleakley. The four men left Clearwater Pass on February 28 at 6:30 a.m. and were expected to return later that night. The Coast Guard began searching for the missing boat shortly after midnight on March 1, 2009. By 1:35 p.m. local time on March 2, 2009, the boat had been located, overturned, with Schuyler clinging to it.

The search for the three missing men was called off by the Coast Guard, but friends and relatives organized their own search. The private search was called off on March 6. Cooper, Smith, and Bleakley are presumed dead. On March 11, Cooper's wife filed for a death certificate in civil court.

On March 25, 2009, a report was released based on a Florida Fish and Wildlife Conservation Commission investigation into the capsizing; the investigation included interviews with Schuyler (the survivor) and an inspection of the boat.  The report concluded the following:

 the anchor line was tied to the port-side transom as part of a (mistaken) plan to free the anchor;
 the vessel, which had a  motor, was then throttled forward;
 the rear of the vessel was pulled into the water because the vessel's motor had been throttled without enough slack in the anchor line; and
 the capsizing ejected the operator and occupants into rough Gulf waters.
The conclusions were accompanied by additional details from the Schuyler interviews. Cooper and Smith became non-responsive and separated from the vessel between 5:30 and 6:30 the morning of March 1, and Bleakley became non-responsive and separated about 24 hours later, which was less than six hours before Schuyler was rescued. The investigator described the symptoms Schuyler witnessed as characteristic of hypothermia.

See also 
 Not Without Hope
 List of American football players who died during their careers
 List of people who disappeared mysteriously at sea

References

External links 
 
 

1982 births
2000s missing person cases
2009 deaths
20th-century African-American sportspeople
21st-century African-American sportspeople
African-American players of American football
American football linebackers
People from Gilbert, Arizona
Sportspeople from the Phoenix metropolitan area
Players of American football from Arizona
Washington Huskies football players
Tampa Bay Buccaneers players
Minnesota Vikings players
Pittsburgh Steelers players
Seattle Seahawks players
Jacksonville Jaguars players
Oakland Raiders players
People lost at sea
Boating accident deaths